Tsemah Junction (Tzomet Tzemach) is a road junction at the southern tip of the Sea of Galilee, where Highway 90 continues along the western shore of the lake towards Tiberias, while Highway 92 splits off to follow the eastern shore. A few kilometres to the east Highway 98 branches off Highway 92 and climbs up to the Golan Heights plateau.

Until 1948, the Arab village of Samakh was situated at this location. In 1920, the Zionist "Labor Brigade" (Hebrew: Gdud HaAvoda) paved the road from Tiberias to Tzemah. Until that date, Samakh's only direct connection to Tiberias had been by boat.

See also
List of junctions and interchanges in Israel

References

Tiberias
Roads in Israel